The 51st Wisconsin Infantry Regiment was a volunteer infantry regiment that served in the Union Army near the end of the American Civil War.

Service
The 51st Wisconsin Infantry Regiment was organized at Milwaukee, Wisconsin, and mustered into Federal service between March 20 and April 29, 1865. 

As the war was nearly over when the unit was formed, the regiment did not participate in any battles. In June 1865, by order of the Secretary of War, the 51st Wisconsin Infantry absorbed the 53rd Wisconsin Infantry Regiment (four companies).

The colonel of the regiment was Leonard Martin of Wisconsin, a graduate of the United States Military Academy (Class of May 1861) and a captain in the Regular Army, 5th United States Artillery.

The regiment was mustered out from August 16–August 30, 1865.

Casualties
Sixteen enlisted men died of disease, for a total of 16 casualties sustained during the unit's history.

Notable people
 Henry G. Klinefelter was 2nd lieutenant of Co. F.  Earlier in the war, he served as an enlisted member of Co. D, 7th Wisconsin Infantry Regiment.  After the war served as a Wisconsin state legislator.
 Denis J. F. Murphy was 1st lieutenant of Co. I after the merger with the 53rd Wisconsin Infantry.  He previously served as a sergeant in the 14th Wisconsin Infantry Regiment, where he had earned a Medal of Honor for his actions at the Second Battle of Corinth, and was wounded five times.

See also

 List of Wisconsin Civil War units
 Wisconsin in the American Civil War

References

External Links 
 The Civil War Archive

Military units and formations established in 1865
Military units and formations disestablished in 1865
Units and formations of the Union Army from Wisconsin
1865 establishments in Wisconsin